Iran participated in the 3rd West Asian Games held in Doha, Qatar from December 1, 2005 to December 10, 2005. Iran ranked 3rd with 20 gold medals in this edition of the West Asian Games.

Competitors

Medal summary

Medal table

Medalists

References

External links
List of medals

West Asian Games
Nations at the 2005 West Asian Games
West Asian Games